Gary C. Greaves (born October 28, 1935) is a former American football tackle who played one season with the Houston Oilers of the American Football League (AFL). He played college football at the University of Miami and attended Baldwin High School in Pittsburgh, Pennsylvania.

References

External links
Just Sports Stats

Living people
1935 births
Players of American football from Pittsburgh
American football tackles
Miami Hurricanes football players
Houston Oilers players
American Football League players